Anaciaeschna triangulifera is a species of dragonfly in the family Aeshnidae. It is found in Angola, the Democratic Republic of the Congo, Ethiopia, Kenya, Madagascar, Malawi, Mozambique, Nigeria, Sierra Leone, South Africa, Tanzania, Uganda, Zambia, Zimbabwe, and possibly Burundi. Its natural habitats are subtropical or tropical dry forests, subtropical or tropical moist lowland forests, subtropical or tropical dry shrubland, subtropical or tropical moist shrubland, rivers, intermittent rivers, shrub-dominated wetlands, freshwater marshes, and intermittent freshwater marshes.

References

Aeshnidae
Insects described in 1896
Taxonomy articles created by Polbot